Boronia obovata is a plant in the citrus family Rutaceae and is endemic to the Blackdown Tableland National Park in Queensland, Australia. It is an erect shrub with many branches, leaves usually with three leaflets, and pink, four-petalled flowers.

Description
The leaves usually have three leaflets, except for those on seedlings and short branches which are simple leaves. The leaflets are elliptic to lance-shaped, with the narrower end towards the base and have a few to many star-like hairs. The edges of the leaflets are turned down or rolled under.

Taxonomy and naming
Boronia obovata was first formally described in 1942 by Cyril Tenison White and the description was published in Proceedings of the Royal Society of Queensland from a specimen collected by Henry George Simmons. The specific epithet (obovata) is derived from the Latin word ovatus meaning "egg-shaped" with the prefix ob- meaning "reverse".

Distribution and habitat
This boronia grows in eucalypt woodland and forest on sandstone on the Blackdown Tableland in central Queensland.

Conservation
Boronia obovata is classed as "least concern" under the Queensland Government Nature Conservation Act 1992.

References 

obovata
Flora of Queensland
Plants described in 1942
Taxa named by Cyril Tenison White